The 2019–20 season was the 51st campaign of the Scottish Basketball Championship, the national basketball league of Scotland. 20 teams were split across Division 1, featuring 10 teams, and Division 2, featuring 10 teams. Glasgow Storm withdrew at the start of the season, leaving Division 1 with 9 teams. Falkirk Fury won their sixth league title.

Format
In Division 1, each team plays each other twice, once home, once away, for a total of 16 games.

In Division 2, each team plays each other twice, once home, once away, for a total of 18 games.

Division 1

Teams

Promoted from 2018 to 2019 Division 2
 Ayrshire Tornadoes
 Perth Phoenix

Relegated from 2018 to 2019 Division 1
 Stirling Knights

Withdrawn (at end of 2018–19)
 Edinburgh University

League table

Playoffs
The draw for the Playoffs was complete on Sunday 1 March 2020. It was announced that the Playoff Final would be played on 28 March 2020 at the Regional Performance Centre in Dundee. The season was then suspended on 13 March 2020 due to the COVID-19 pandemic, prior to the completion of the semi-final stage.

Quarter-finals

Semi-finals

Division 2

Teams

Promoted to 2019-20 Division 1
 Ayrshire Tornadoes
 Perth Phoenix

Relegated from 2018 to 2019 Division 1
 Stirling Knights

New Teams
 Glasgow City from Strathclyde League
 Inverness Lions from Highland League

League table

Playoffs
Semi-finals

Scottish Cup
Scottish Cup (basketball)

The draw for the 74th Scottish Cup was made on Friday 26 July 2019. All 16 teams entered at the first round stage; overall the number of teams competing was down 4 on the previous year. The defending champions were the Falkirk Fury. The final was played on 1 February 2020 at the Lagoon Leisure Centre, Paisley.

Round of 16 

Quarter-finals

Semi-finals

Final

References

Scottish Basketball Championship Men seasons
Scotland
Scotland
basketball
basketball